Musik Pop is the sixth studio album by the Indonesian jazz group Maliq & D'Essentials. The album was released on May 15, 2014, by Organic Records. The main track is a collaboration with Indra Lesmana, entitled "Ananda".

Indonesian Tempo magazine was entering to Musik Pop for Top 9 Indonesian Music Album with Tulus' Gajah.

The album was nominated for "Album of the Year" at the 2nd Indonesian Choice Awards, but lost to Sheila On 7's Musim Yang Baik. It was also nominated for "The Best Album" at the 2014 Hai Reader's Poll Music Awards and "Best of the Best Album" at the 2015 Anugerah Musik Indonesia.

Background
Maliq & D'Essentials collaborated with Indra Lesmana on two tracks for the album, namely "Ananda" and "Nirwana". "Ananda" was released as a single on April 15, 2014. The band has decided to focus on mostly on digital releases. "We really want to focus on digital, because it looks like the CD era is coming to an end. We will treat CDs, cassettes, and vinyl as merchandise, while digital will be our main focus in the future. We will create a box set as well," said the vocalist, Angga Puradiredja. The album has been available online since May 1, 2014.

Track listing
Music and lyrics by Maliq & D'Essentials unless otherwise stated.

Awards and nominations

Personnel
Maliq & D'Essentials
Angga Puradiredja - vocals
Indah Wisnuwardhana - vocals
Widi Puradiredja - drums
Dendy "Javafinger" Sukarno - bass
Arya "Lale" Aditya - guitar
Ilman Ibrahim - keyboards

Additional musicians
Indra Lesmana - vocoder, synthesizer
Alvin Witarsa - 1st violin
Saptadi Kristiawan - 2nd violin
Jeffrin Parulian - viola
Robby Subarja - cello

Production
Maliq & D'Essentials - producer
Eki "EQ" Puradiredja - producer
Widi Puradiredja - mixing, engineer
Dendy "Javafinger" Sukarno - mixing, engineer
Geoff Pesche - mastering

References

2014 albums
Maliq & D'Essentials albums